The 2005 UEFA Regions' Cup was the fourth UEFA Regions' Cup. It was held in Poland and won by the Basque Country team from Spain, which beat Bulgaria's South-West Sofia 1–0 in the final.

Preliminary round 
The eight teams in the preliminary round were drawn into two groups of four, with the fixtures for each group being played in the same country. Group East's matches were played in Romania and those for Group West were played in Slovenia. The two group winners and the best runner-up advanced to the intermediary round.

Group East

Group West

Intermediary round 
The 29 teams which went straight through to the intermediary round were joined by England's Mid-Cheshire, the Central team of Slovakia and the Romanian Dacia team. The 32 teams were drawn into eight groups of four, with the following countries hosting each group's matches:
Group 1 – 
Group 2 – 
Group 3 – 
Group 4 – 
Group 5 – 
Group 6 – 
Group 7 – 
Group 8 – 
The winners of each group qualified for the final tournament.

Group 1

Group 2

Group 3

Group 4

Group 5

Group 6

Group 7

Group 8

Final tournament 
Poland was chosen to host the final tournament, with matches being played from 3 July to 9 July 2005.

Group stage 
The eight intermediary group winners were drawn into two groups of four, with the two group winners advancing to the final.

Group A

Group B

Final

See also 
UEFA Regions' Cup

External links
Official UEFA Regions' Cup site
RSSSF page for the 2005 UEFA Regions' Cup

2005
Regions' Cup
Regions' Cup
International association football competitions hosted by Poland